Marina Lazarovska (born 29 July 1978) is a former Macedonian tennis player.

In her career, she won three singles and eight doubles titles on the ITF circuit. On 25 September 2000, Lazarovska achieved her career-high singles ranking of world number 362. On 30 August 1999, she reached a doubles ranking of world number 302.

Representing North Macedonia, Lazarovska has an overall record of 14–13 at the Fed Cup.
She retired from professional tennis 2003.

ITF finals

Singles (3–2)

Doubles (8–6)

Fed Cup participation

Singles

Doubles

External links
 
 
 

1978 births
Living people
Macedonian female tennis players